Umling is a village in Ri-Bhoi district, Meghalaya, India.

See also 
 Ri-Bhoi district

References 

Villages in Ri-Bhoi district